The coat of arms used by the 
United Arab Republic featured the Pan-Arab colours of the flag of the United Arab Republic (in vertical form) on a shield carried by the Eagle of Saladin.  Below, a green scroll has the Arabic text for "United Arab Republic" الجمهورية العربية المتحدة al-Ǧumhūriyyah al-ʿArabiyyah al-Muttaḥidah.

After the union of Egypt and Syria ended in 1961, Egypt retained the name "United Arab Republic" and continued to use this coat of arms, until the Federation of Arab Republics project caused a change in 1972.

References

20th century in Syria
Arab nationalist symbols
United Arab Republic
United Arab Republic
History of Egypt (1900–present)
United Arab Republic